The Knights of Columbus Building, also known as the Aero Club Building, in Portland, Oregon, was a Late Gothic Revival architecture building that was built in 1920.  It was listed on the National Register of Historic Places from 1990 until its demolition. The building was demolished in 1998. The property is now the site of the Paramount Hotel.

The Knights of Columbus inaugurated the building as its Portland lodge on October 21, 1920. It was designed by the Portland architectural firm of Jacobberger & Smith. By 1937, the Knights organization had moved out. In July 1937, the building was purchased by the Aero Club of Oregon (the Portland chapter of the National Aeronautics Association), who at the time were using a nearby building. The building underwent a remodeling in fall 1937, using plans designed by Portland-based Whitehouse & Church, the partnership of Morris H. Whitehouse and Walter E. Church.

See also
 National Register of Historic Places listings in Southwest Portland, Oregon
 Wonder Ballroom, another Jacobberger & Smith building

References

External links
Photo of the Knights of Columbus Building at Vintage Portland

1920 establishments in Oregon
1998 disestablishments in Oregon
Buildings and structures completed in 1920
Buildings and structures demolished in 1998
Clubhouses on the National Register of Historic Places in Oregon
Demolished buildings and structures in Portland, Oregon
Former National Register of Historic Places in Portland, Oregon
Gothic Revival architecture in Oregon
Knights of Columbus buildings in the United States
Southwest Portland, Oregon